The Schmidtburg is a ruined hill castle next to Schneppenbach (Hunsrück) in Germany.  The castle was built up in 926, and was destroyed during the War of the Grand Alliance (1688–1697) by French troops in 1688.

External links
official Homepage

Castles in Rhineland-Palatinate
Ruins in Germany
Hill castles
Castles in the Hunsrück